Badreh (also Romanized as Bedre and Badra) is a city in and the capital of Badreh District, Ilam Province, Iran. At the 2006 census, its population was 3,775, in 868 families. The city is populated by Kurds.

References

Populated places in Badreh County

Cities in Ilam Province
Kurdish settlements in Ilam Province